Bala Duri-ye Dovvom is a village in Baghlan Province in north eastern Afghanistan.

It is located on a river south of Baghlan city.

See also 
Baghlan Province

References

External links
Satellite map at Maplandia.com

Populated places in Baghlan Province